The 1929 Iowa State Cyclones football team represented Iowa State College of Agricultural and Mechanic Arts (later renamed Iowa State University) in the Big Six Conference during the 1929 college football season. In their fourth season under head coach C. Noel Workman, the Cyclones compiled a 1–7 record (0–5 against conference opponents), finished in last place in the conference, and were outscored by opponents by a combined total of 135 to 54. They played their home games at State Field in Ames, Iowa.

Harry Johnson and Ed Schlenker were the team captains. Maynard Spear was selected as a first-team all-conference player.

Schedule

References

Iowa State
Iowa State Cyclones football seasons
Iowa State Cyclones football